Reign & Shine is a 2005 album by the South African mbaqanga group the Mahotella Queens. The album was a break from their usual mgqashiyo music, focusing on three-part vocal harmonies and percussion (by Veli Shabangu), with electric guitar and bass only appearing on some tracks. The album featured new compositions such as "Amazemula" ("Monster") and "Ndodana Yolahleko" as well as old favourites like "Town Hall" and "Amabhongo" in addition to the South African national anthem, "Nkosi Sikelel' iAfrika".

Track listing
 "Amazemula" ("Monster")
 "Saphel' Isizwe" ("Disease Is All Over The Nation")
 "Muntu Wesilisa" ("We're Talking to You")
 "Ndodana Yolahleko"
 "Town Hall"
 "Mbube" ("The Lion")
 "Amabhongo"
 "Sela Ndini" ("Thieves Are About")
 "Thandanani" ("Love One Another")
 "Siyancela" ("We're Begging You")
 "Safa Yindlala" ("They Died Hungry")
 "Nkosi Sikelel' iAfrika" ("God Bless Africa")

Personnel
 Hilda Tloubatla (vocals)
 Nobesuthu Mbadu (vocals)
 Mildred Mangxola (vocals)
 Veli Shabangu (percussions, backing vocals)
 Texan Thusi (lead guitar, rhythm guitar)
 Madoda Ntshingila (bass guitar)
 Engineer: Ian Osrin
 Producer: Ian Osrin
 An AS Entertainment/African Cream Music production

Mahlathini and the Mahotella Queens albums
2005 albums